Anar Jamal oghly Mammadkhanov (20 July 1970, Baku, Azerbaijan – 23 April 2011, Baku, Azerbaijan) was a Member of the National Assembly of Azerbaijan, social activist and the captain of Parni iz Baku KVN team.

Life
After graduating from Baku State University in 1991, he became the captain of Parni iz Baku KVN team. He served as an MP from Surakhani constituency from 1995 to 2005. He was widely praised for creating Day.az, which was Azerbaijan's first news portal.

On 23 April 2011, he died from sudden heart attack.

Criticism
He has been described in the media as populist and labeled far-right, though this is disputed by other observers. Mammadkhanov, who has refused to align himself with Azerbaijani far-right politicians such as Ganira Pashayeva and Ali S. Hasanov, views himself as a right-wing liberal. Mammadkhanov was also criticized as being a mere demagogue who attacks politicians on superficial issues and their private lives while being unable to provide a valid alternative.

Personal life
Mammadkhanov was greatly influenced by Winston Churchill's policies. He was an avid smoker and drinker for most of his life, something which eventually led to his death.

References

External links
 http://www.meclis.gov.az

1970 births
2011 deaths
Members of the National Assembly (Azerbaijan)
Entertainers from Baku
Politicians from Baku

Burials at II Alley of Honor
KVN